CU Virginis is a single star in the equatorial constellation of Virgo. It has an apparent visual magnitude of 4.99, which is bright enough to be faintly visible to the naked eye.

This is one of the best studied Ap stars. It has a stellar classification of Ap Si with strong lines of silicon and weak helium lines. Both the spectrum and luminosity of the star vary with the rotation, and it is classified as a α2 Canum Venaticorum variable with the designation CU Virginis (CU Vir). There is some evidence that the rotation period may vary slightly over a timescale measured in decades. Such changes have been observed to occur in glitches, rather than varying constantly.

CU Virginis has three times the mass of the Sun and double the Sun's radius. It is radiating 100 times the Sun's luminosity from its photosphere at an effective temperature of 12,750 K. The star has a strong magnetic field, placing it in the class of magnetic chemically peculiar stars. The magnetic pole may be displaced by 87° from the axis of rotation, and the effective magnetic field is seen to vary over the course of a rotation. The mean surface magnetic field varies over the range .

This star is a radio emitter, with the emission being modulated by the rotational phase. This emission is believed to be gyrosynchrotron radiation emitted by mildly relativistic (Lorentz factor of γ ≤ 2) electrons trapped in the magnetosphere". Two pulses of 100% circularly polarized radio energy are detected each rotation, which may be produced via an electron cyclotron maser process. These polarized beams are then refracted as they pass through cold plasma in the star's magnetosphere.

References

Virgo (constellation)
B-type main-sequence stars
Ap stars
Alpha2 Canum Venaticorum variables
Durchmusterung objects
124224
069389
5313
Virginis, CU